Edward or Ted Russell may refer to:

Politics
 Edward Russell (Maine politician) (1782–1835), secretary of state of Maine (1830–31), brigadier general in the militia
 Lord Edward Russell (1805–1887), British Member of Parliament
 Lord Edward Russell (1642–1714), English politician
 Edward Russell, 1st Baron Russell of Liverpool (1834–1920), British journalist and Liberal politician
 Edward Russell, 23rd Baron de Clifford (1824–1877), British Whig politician
 J. Edward Russell (1867–1953), U.S. Representative from Ohio
 Edward Russell (Australian politician) (1878–1925), senator
 Ted Russell (Canadian politician) (1904–1977), Canadian politician and writer
 Ted Russell (Irish politician) (1912–2004), Irish politician and company director

Other
 Edward Russell, 3rd Earl of Bedford (1572–1627), Earl in the Peerage of England
 Edward Russell, 1st Earl of Orford (1653–1727), Royal Navy officer, First Lord of the Admiralty under King William III
 Edward Russell, 2nd Baron Russell of Liverpool (1895–1981), British soldier, lawyer and historian
 Edward Russell, 26th Baron de Clifford (1907–1982), only son of Jack Southwell Russell, 25th Baron de Clifford
 Edward Russell (trade unionist) (1867–1943), Australian trade unionist
 Edward Russell (television presenter) (born 1989), British Singaporean television presenter and actor
 E. John Russell (1872–1965), British agriculturalist
 E. S. Russell (1887–1954), Scottish biologist and philosopher of biology
 Edward Russell (cricketer) (1875–1940), English cricketer
 Ted Russell (musician), Mississippi bandleader and conductor

See also
 Theodore Russell (disambiguation)